Euplotes elegans is a species of marine ciliates. It has been isolated from the anoxic Mariager Fjord.

References 

 Encystment-inducing factors in the ciliate Euplotes elegans. A Tomaru, Zoological science, 2002

External links 

 Euplotes elegans at WoRMS

Hypotrichea
Species described in 1932